The 1942 Purdue Boilermakers football team was an American football team that represented Purdue University during the 1942 Big Ten Conference football season.  In their first season under head coach Elmer Burnham, the Boilermakers compiled a 1–8 record, finished in eighth place in the Big Ten Conference with a 1–4 record against conference opponents, and were outscored by their opponents by a total of 179 to 27.

Schedule

References

Purdue
Purdue Boilermakers football seasons
Purdue Boilermakers football